Dominique Moore (born 12 January 1986) is a British actress and writer best known for her roles in BAFTA Winning Horrible Histories, Hotel Trubble and Paddington Green. She starred in Horrible Histories: The Movie and voices the character of Lulu in Disney's Sadie Sparks.

Moore is a former pupil of Sylvia Young Theatre School. The BBC fly-on-the-wall documentary series Paddington Green followed her as she won a scholarship and attended auditions.

Acting career

Theatre 
Moore began her acting career appearing in various West End musicals including Oliver!, Hey! Mr Producer, Annie and Whistle Down the Wind. She played Young Nala in the original cast of The Lion King at the Lyceum Theatre. In 2013, Moore played Sinai in Gutted at Theatre Royal Stratford East.

In 2017, Moore was cast as Lottie alongside David Tennant in Patrick Maber's Don Juan in Soho at Wydnham's Theatre.

 Television 
In 2000, Moore began her on screen career in Channel 4's Get Up, Stand Up before landing roles in CBBC shows The Queen's Nose, The Crust, UGetMe, Stupid!, and Hotel Trubble.

From 2005 to 2006, Moore played Chanel O'Grady in Footballers' Wives: Extra Time.In 2008, Moore was cast in Disney's Life Bites. Following her success she featured in Disney Movie Surfers Race to Witch Mountain and Prince of Persia: The Sands of Time.

Moore has played various roles in the multi award-winning Horrible Histories. Her portrayal of Mary Seacole and Rosa Parks gained her much recognition in the press and from celebrities including Eddie Izzard, Adrian Lester and Tanya Franks. She has appeared in sketches on Little Miss Jocelyn and in 2008 she appeared in the BBC Three show Barely Legal. In 2009 she played Aretha in the CBBC musical comedy My Almost Famous Family.CBBC's new musical comedy My Almost Famous Family: introduction BBC Press Office, 21 August 2009

Moore is the voice of Flo in Channel 5's animation Floogals. In 2017, Moore played recurring roles in the hit Tracey Ullman's Show on BBC One and HBO. She also featured in Tracey Ullman's Tracey Breaks the News.

Moore appears as Rosie in the 2019 adaptation of Four Weddings and a Funeral.

 Film 
In 2013, Moore starred opposite Oscar winner Ben Kingsley in The Physician. She features in the 2018 television film Torvill & Dean directed by Gillies MacKinnon.

Music
In 1999, Moore recorded a version of the Cyndi Lauper hit "True Colours" for a Peugeot 406 commercial.Peugeot 406 True colours (Dominique Moore) YouTube Moore sings the theme tune for Hotel Trubble and co-wrote "The Musical" episode in Series 3.

Fashion career
After her experience as a model in Paris, Moore was inspired by fashion design and started her own label Anita Moore Designs funded by The Prince's Trust.

 Personal life 
Moore was diagnosed with cancer, specifically Hodgkin lymphoma, after discovering a lump on the back of her neck whilst on set of filming Hotel Trubble. She has had treatment for this and is free of cancer. An edition of Newsround'' called "Dominique presents Living with Cancer - a Newsround Special" in 2011 described how she coped.

In 2015, Moore gave birth to her son. She is engaged to British comedian Kevin J.

Dominique Moore Arts 
Moore founded Dominique Moore Arts (DMA) In May 2016. Owing to her successful and expansive career, she now mentors young professional actors all over the world. DMA has working relationships with a number of industry professionals and productions that provide opportunities for the young talent she works with. Dominique is passionate about providing actors with the tools, industry understanding, knowledge and support to help them succeed.

Filmography

Film

Television

Video games

References

External links

1986 births
Living people
Actresses from London
Black British actresses
English people of Jamaican descent
20th-century English actresses
21st-century English actresses
Alumni of the Sylvia Young Theatre School
English film actresses
English stage actresses
English television actresses
English voice actresses
English female models